Sutter is an unincorporated community in Tazewell County, Illinois, United States. Sutter is southeast of Hopedale.  Sutter formerly was a station on the Illinois Terminal Railroad interurban system.

References

Unincorporated communities in Tazewell County, Illinois
Unincorporated communities in Illinois
Peoria metropolitan area, Illinois